Captain Phantom is a 1953 Italian historical adventure film directed by Primo Zeglio and starring Frank Latimore, Anna Maria Sandri, Maxwell Reed and Paola Barbara. It was shot at the Cinecittà Studios in Rome. The film's sets were designed by the art director Alberto Boccianti. It was distributed by the Italian subsidiary of the Rank Organisation.

Plot
In the early 1800s, the Spanish regiments are celebrating their victory over the French Legions of Bonaparte. In the midst of the celebration, Miguel, Duke of Canabil, is summoned to his commander's quarters and given the news that his father, and Admiral in the Spanish Navy, has betrayed the crown of Spain by turning his fleet over to the enemy. The stunned Miguel, humiliated and scorned by his regiment, takes a blood oath to find out the truth about his father. His search leads him to the mystery ship "Asuncion", commanded by Ingio de Costa, an unscrupulous, vicious man with a hand for evil. The latter is also trying to get one of his evil hands on the fair Consuelo, daughter of the governor of Cadiz.

Cast 
Frank Latimore as  Captain Miguel
Maxwell Reed as  Don Inigo da Costa 
Anna Maria Sandri as  Consuelo
Paola Barbara as  Soledad
Katyna Ranieri as  Amparo  
Tino Buazzelli as  Damian Pinto
Juan de Landa as  Carlos
Sergio Fantoni as  Officer in second   
Mario Carotenuto as  Sailor 
 Gianni Cavalieri as The Doctor
 Sergio Fantoni as Lieutenant Nebbia
 Fedele Gentile as Sandoval
 Carlo Tamberlani as The Colonel
 Cesare Fantoni as 	The Admiral in Havana
 Mario Feliciani as The Sailor Feliciano
 Aldo Giuffrè as 	Moreno
 Carlo Lombardi as The Admiral in A Coruña
 Franco Marturano as 	Don Ferrante de Ávila
 Franco Pastorino as The young Sailor
 Nico Pepe as 	The bearded Officer
 Edoardo Toniolo as Captain of the 'Anita Lopez'

References

External links

1953 films
1950s historical adventure films
Italian historical adventure films
Films directed by Primo Zeglio
Films scored by Carlo Rustichelli
Films set in Spain
Films set in the 1800s
Seafaring films
1950s Italian-language films
Films shot at Cinecittà Studios
1950s Italian films